Ulyanovsky or Ulyanovskaya may refer to:

Places 
Ulyanovsky District, Kaluga Oblast, an administrative and municipal district in Kaluga Oblast, Russia
Ulyanovsky District, Ulyanovsk Oblast, an administrative and municipal district in Ulyanovsk Oblast, Russia
Ulyanovsk Oblast or Ulyanovskaya oblast, a federal subject of Russia

People 
Nadezhda Ulyanovskaya (born 1978), Soviet and Russian football player and referee

See also
Ulyanovsky (rural locality), a list of rural localities in Russia
Ulyanovsk
Ulyanov
Ulyanka (disambiguation)